Dougherty (formerly Daugherty) is a small unincorporated community in Rains County, Texas, United States. It lies at an elevation of 466 feet (142 m).

References

Unincorporated communities in Rains County, Texas
Unincorporated communities in Texas